John Lawrence Strands (December 5, 1885 – January 19, 1957) was a Federal League third baseman, second baseman and outfielder. In 35 career games, he had 14 hits in 75 at-bats. He batted and threw right-handed.

Strands was born in Chicago, Illinois, and died in Forest Park, Illinois.

References

External links
Baseball Reference.com page

1885 births
1957 deaths
Newark Peppers players
Major League Baseball third basemen
Minor league baseball managers
Lynn Leonardites players
Lynn Shoemakers players
Worcester Busters players